Francesco Maria Ricchino may refer to two architects:

Francesco Ricchino (died 1560s), Renaissance architect, painter and poet from Rovato
Francesco Maria Richini (1584–1658), Baroque architect from Milan